Alphonse d'Ornano (1548 - January 20 or 21, 1610) was a Marshal of France, active during the French Wars of Religion.

He was born in Bastelica, Corsica, the son of Sampiero Corso and Vannina d'Ornano. He died in Paris and was buried in Bordeaux. He was the father of Jean-Baptiste d'Ornano.

He was mayor of Bordeaux from 1599 to 1610.

References

1548 births
1610 deaths
People from Corsica